, literally "mouth island", is one of the Tokara Islands, belonging to Kagoshima Prefecture. The island,  in area, and has a population of 140 persons. The island can only be reached by boat as it has no airport, there are regular ferry service to the city of Kagoshima on the mainland. Travel time is about 6 hours. The islanders are dependent mainly on agriculture, fishing and seasonal tourism. The island is home to the rare Kuchinoshima breed of Japanese native cattle.

Geography

Although there has been no eruption recorded in historical times, Moedake emits steam, and discoloration of the ocean in nearby waters in 2001 indicates ongoing volcanic activity. 
The local climate is classified as subtropical, with a rainy season from May through September.

History
The island was once part of the Ryukyu Kingdom. During the Edo period, Kuchinoshima was part of Satsuma Domain and was administered as part of Kawanabe District. In 1896, the island was transferred to the administrative control of Ōshima District, Kagoshima, and from 1911 was administered as part of the village of Toshima, Kagoshima. From 1946 to 1952, the island was administered by the United States as part of the Provisional Government of Northern Ryukyu Islands.

The island is home to a small and criticallyendangered population of feral cattle, the Kuchinoshima (Kuchinoshima-Ushi) breed, which – with the Mishima breed – is one of two remaining breeds of Japanese native cattle. Kuchinoshima cattle is not the only feral cattle in Japan as there is a small group of feral cattle on Kazura Island next to Naru Island.

See also
List of islands in Japan
List of volcanoes in Japan

References 

National Geospatial Intelligence Agency (NGIA). Prostar Sailing Directions 2005 Japan En route. Prostar Publications (2005).

External links 
Official home page

Tokara Islands
Islands of Kagoshima Prefecture